Bayley Wiggins (born 3 September 1998) is a New Zealand cricketer. He made his Twenty20 debut for Central Districts in the 2018–19 Super Smash on 1 February 2019. He made his List A debut on 29 January 2020, for Central Districts in the 2019–20 Ford Trophy. He made his first-class debut on 23 October 2021, for Central Districts in the 2021–22 Plunket Shield season, and scored a century in the first innings of the match.

References

External links
 

1998 births
Living people
New Zealand cricketers
Central Districts cricketers
Place of birth missing (living people)